William Ramsay Maule, 1st Baron Panmure of Brechin and Navar (27 October 1771 – 13 April 1852) was a Scottish landowner and politician.

Life
He was born William Ramsay, the younger son of George Ramsay, 8th Earl of Dalhousie and his wife Elizabeth Glen. His father was the son of Jean Maule, granddaughter of George Maule, 2nd Earl of Panmure. William attended the High School in Edinburgh from 1780 to 1784 as a contemporary as Walter Scott. On the death of George Maule in 1782, under the terms of Maule's will, he adopted the surname Maule.

In 1782 he succeeded to the Maule estates on the death of his great-uncle William Maule, 1st Earl Panmure, and assumed by Royal licence the same year the additional surname and arms of Maule. He represented Forfarshire in Parliament in 1796 and again between 1805 and 1831, when Maule was raised to the peerage at the coronation of William IV of the United Kingdom, as Baron Panmure, of Brechin and Navar in the County of Forfar, echoing his great-uncle's title.

William lived for many years in the family home of Brechin Castle and appears to have remodelled it in the fashionable Georgian style soon after his inheritance.

Panmure was a patron of the artists commissioning several paintings from Thomas Musgrave Joy and paying for him to take on a student.

He is buried in the churchyard of Brechin Cathedral. The large obelisk marking his grave lies north west of the church.

Family
Lord Panmure married Patricia Heron Gordon on 1 December 1794. They had nine children, including:

Fox Maule Ramsay (1801–1874), later 2nd Baron Panmure and 11th Earl of Dalhousie.
Hon. Lauderdale Maule (1807–1854).

Nevertheless, he was estranged from his wife, and quarrelled with his eldest son for siding with her. Patricia died in 1821, and on 4 June 1822, Maule married Elizabeth Barton. Through this connection he inherited the estates of Barnton, Edinburgh and rebuilt the main house Barton House to a design by David Hamilton.

References

External links

1771 births
1852 deaths
Barons in the Peerage of the United Kingdom
Maule, William
Members of the Parliament of Great Britain for Scottish constituencies
British MPs 1790–1796 
Members of the Parliament of the United Kingdom for Scottish constituencies
UK MPs 1802–1806
UK MPs 1806–1807
UK MPs 1807–1812
UK MPs 1812–1818
UK MPs 1818–1820
UK MPs 1820–1826
UK MPs 1826–1830
UK MPs 1830–1831
UK MPs who were granted peerages
William
Peers of the United Kingdom created by William IV